The 2022 AFL Women's All-Australian team represents the best-performed players of the 2022 AFL Women's season. The team was announced on 5 April 2022 as a complete women's Australian rules football team of 21 players. The team is honorary and does not play any games.

Selection panel
The selection panel for the 2022 AFL Women's All-Australian team consisted of chairwoman Nicole Livingstone, Andrew Dillon, Laura Kane, Brad Scott, Sam Virgo, Narelle Smith, Kelli Underwood, Sarah Black, Megan Waters and Tim Harrington.

Initial squad
The initial 40-woman All-Australian squad was announced on 30 March.  had the most players selected in the initial squad with seven, with players from grand finalists  and Melbourne making up one-third of the squad, and every team had at least one representative. Eleven players from the 2021 team were among those selected.

Final team
The final team was announced on 5 April. Grand finalists Adelaide and Melbourne had the most selections with four, with nine teams represented overall. Five players achieved selection for the first time, while seven players from the 2021 team were selected, with  captain Emma Kearney achieving selection for the sixth consecutive year. Kearney was announced as the All-Australian captain and  captain Hayley Miller was announced as the vice-captain.

Note: the position of coach in the AFL Women's All-Australian team is traditionally awarded to the coach of the premiership-winning team.

References

External links
 AFLW Awards

2022 AFL Women's season